Tsimshian, known by its speakers as Sm'álgyax, is a dialect of the Tsimshian language spoken in northwestern British Columbia and southeastern Alaska.  Sm'algyax means literally "real or true language."

The linguist Tonya Stebbins estimated the number of speakers of Tsimshian in 2001 as around 400 and in 2003 as 200 or fewer (see references below).  Whichever figure is more accurate, she added in 2003 that most speakers are over 70 in age and very few are under 50.  About 50 of an ethnic population of 1,300 Tsimshian in Alaska speak the language.

Phonology

Vowels
Next to transcriptions in the IPA are the conventional orthography in angle brackets.

The low back vowel can either be the long [a] or the short and slightly raised [ʌ] depending on context. John Asher Dunn assumes this vowel as the schwa.

Underlining /a/ is optional for indicating the back long vowel, and fluent speakers will usually omit it.

Dunn's representation of the high back vowel seems to be slightly more forward than the IPA equivalent, since he uses the phonetic symbols [ɨ̈] or [ɪ̈].

Consonants
As in the Vowels section, symbols in boldface reflect the conventional orthography, and IPA equivalents are given in brackets. In the practical orthography, uvulars are indicated by underlining the velar letters, and the position of the apostrophe before or after the consonant letter distinguishes glottalization.

Both John Asher Dunn and Franz Boas (as reported by A.C. Graf von der Schulenberg ) find that the fricative /s/ has two variants:  [s] or [ʃ].

The velar glide /ɰ/  is a "w pronounced with lips unrounded".

The glottalization diacritic  may be switched to the other side of a velar segment depending on whether it falls pre-, post- or intervocalically. In speech, glottalized segments before a vowel will result in simultaneous realization of both, [kʼ]. Glottalized segments that follow vowels produce the glottalization first, then the consonant closure, [ʼk]. Intervocalically, the glottalization depends on where the stress falls. [ʼk] is pronounced after a stressed syllable, and [kʼ] is pronounced before a stress.

Orthography
The Tsimshian orthography in use today is based on that developed by Tsimshianicists since the 1960s. It originally stems from Bruce Rigsby's work on the Gitksan language and includes John A. Dunn's work on Tsimshian and Marie-Lucie Tarpent's work on Nisga'a and Southern Tsimshian.  Dunn, Tarpent, and Susan Marsden substantially revised it for School District No. 52 (Prince Rupert) when preparing the Suwilaay'msga Na Ga'niiyatgm, Teachings of Our Grandfathers book series in the early 1990s, with the blessing of the Tsimshian hereditary chiefs.  Since then, the orthography and the recording of the language have largely been conducted by the Tsimshian Sm'algyax Authority. The Living Legacy Talking Dictionary provides both written and spoken samples of the language.

Another orthography, used only in Alaska, is taught by a private organization called Dum Baal-dum.

Syllable structure
Tsimshian utilizes (C)CV or (C)CVC(C) syllable structures in which the vowels can occur long or short. Syllabic consonants are common and can technically occur anywhere within the word. The only consonants that qualify as syllabic (indicated optionally by underlining) are the sonorants /m/, /n/ and /l/ (and their glottalized counterparts). (Some writers will follow the Gitksan orthographic practice of writing the syllabic sonorants as /im/, /in/ and /il/.)

Examples:
 /hæj.mæː.dm/ "northeast wind"
 /n.læk/ "fireplace"
 /k'l.k'oːl/ plural of intransitive verb "dull"

Consonant clusters are common. Schulenberg reports finding /pt, pts, ptl, kts, qp, qtk, qtsc, qsk, nts, tɟ/ among many others, though only a smaller portion can occur in the rime. Note that these clusters do not contain syllabic consonants, but are only either in the onset or the coda. 
Clusters at the ends of words often have an epenthetic vowel inserted, which is usually /a/ [ʌ] but can also be either /i/ [ɪ] or /ɯ/ [ɯ].

Examples (with other phonological changes):
 /ɟelq/ → [ɟelaɢ] "outside"
 /æːlks/ → [æːliks] "servant"
 /ʌʔʌjæːɰx/ → [æːjæːwɯx] "Aurora Borealis, Northern Lights"

Vowel pitch
The long vowels of Tsimshian must be pronounced in one of three distinct ways: with a sustained pitch /eː/ → [eː]; a "falling pitch and offglide"/eː/ → [êə], or with the insertion of a glottal stop /eː/ → [eʔe]. In every day writing, the diacritical marks may be left out, so that the first two could be written , whereas it is common to represent [eʔe]

Examples:
 (steady pitch)   [kpiːl] "ten" (of abstract and round objects)
 (falling pitch)    [nôsɯ] "wolverine"
 (glottal interruption) [χbæʔælʌ] "squall; storm from the south"

Stress
The primary stress generally falls on the last syllable of a word. In the case of a suffix or connective being added, then the stress falls on the penultimate syllable.

Phonological processes
There are a number of complex phonological processes that affect underlying segments. The following is just a sample of some of the changes that may occur. 
 Short vowels followed by /l/ often become long vowels with /l/-deletion. /wælp/ → /wæːp/ "house"
 Glottalized /k/ and /q/ between vowels are often shortened to just a glottal stop. /sɒk'æɬ/ → [sɒʔæɬ] "divide, settle an estate"
 At the ends of words /q/ may undergo lenition to /χ/. /iːmq/ → /imχ/ "beard"
 A short vowel may be lengthened if the primary stress falls on it. /χæ/ → /χæː/ "male slave"
 /l/ and /n/ may alternate in reduplication. /c'inˀæm/ → /c'ilc'inˀæm/ "give"
 Long vowels may become diphthongs. /ɬoːl/ → /ɬowl/ "push through the water"
(note: The existence of diphthongs is questionable. Schulenberg claims that Franz Boas "always heard the individual vowels pronounced separately." Dunn, however, seems to believe that younger speakers will realize a  diphthong. There may have been a change in the pronunciation since Schulenberg's research in 1894 and Dunn's subsequent work starting in the 1968. In any event, diphthongs are rare.)

Morphology
Tsimshian can be classified as a  polysynthetic language, although it is less so than other Native North American languages. Tense, for instance, is not marked with the verb, but always appears as a separate pre-verbal word. The verb stands out as the most important word in the sentence—much of the information can be expressed by affixing onto it. Nouns, however, do have a number of clitics that may be attached. There are multiple connectors that are suffixed or prefixed onto adjacent words which can create long strings of lexical items.

Forming the plural

Reduplication
Tsimshian has an extensive system of reduplication, which is used in most cases to form the plural of both nouns and verbs. There is a complex set of phonological processes that affect both the vowel and the consonant in reduplication. Schulenberg records at least 12 different classes of reduplication but Dunn later condenses these to just five, depending on which part of the word is copied, and whether it is prefixed, suffixed or infixed. However, each class contains irregular forms.

Distributives
Besides reduplication, plurals can also be formed by adding lexical clitics. Prefixing or infixing /g̲a/ acts as a distributive. It is best translated as "each one his/her own". The words that take this prefix usually have a specific relation to an individual, such as body parts, clothing and kin.

 /goot/ "heart"→ /g̲agoot/ "hearts"
 /agwinübiip/ "great uncle" → /agwig̲anübiip/ "great uncles"

Iteratives
The word /gyik/ "again" may be prefixed to form some plurals, especially those referring to time.

 /suunt/ "summer"→ /gyiksuunt/ "summers"

Intensives
The word for "very" /lu'kwil/ can be shortened to /lu-/ and pre- or infixed  onto some words to form the plural. This process may result in extremely divergent forms, because of phonological processes.

 /hadiks/ "swim" → /la̰heediks/ "swim (plural)"

Isomorphics and Suppletives
Finally, some plural forms are the same as the singular (/lak/ "fire" → /lak/ "fires") and some words have suppletive plurals, where there is no morphological relationship between the two (/waa/ "name" → /uust/ "names").

Suffixes
Derivational Suffixes
There are ten suffixes that may be attached to words to derive words with meanings related in some way to the original morpheme . These suffixes can change either the grammatical relationship and/or the grammatical function. The names for the types listed below are shortened descriptions of those provided by Dunn.

 Consequential: /-x/ (sometimes /-ḵ/) The derived form is the consequence of or has been affected by the stem. /ḵ'o'a̰l/ "forget" → /ḵ'oolax/ "dull; warm one's back by the fire"
 Instrumental: /-t/ The derived form is a person or thing that uses the stem in some way. /gyemk/ "sun, moon" → /gyemga̰t/ "astronomer"
 Purposive: both /-l/ and /-n/ These two suffixes indicate that the stem is the goal or intention of a person, thing or action. /buu/ "blow, sound (of a whale)" → /buul/ "warn"
 Singularly Qualitative: /-k/ The derived form shares a single quality with the root. /gwisgwaas/ "bluejay" → /gwisgwaask/ "blue"
 Plurally Qualitative: /-s, -sk, -ts/ (sometimes /-k/) The derived form is in many respects similar to the root. /yuutk/ "carry around the neck" → /yuutsk/ "necklace"
 Metaphorical: /-tk/ The derived form has a metaphorical relationship with the stem. /ɫoo/ "drift, swim (fish)" → /ɫo'otk/ "clouds"

Lexical Suffixes
There are five lexically derived morphemes that can be attached to words to alter the meaning. The affixed morphemes can be extremely altered from their original forms, sometimes according to phonological rules, sometimes arbitrarily. Usually the suffix root is shortened to one syllable before it is attached.

 /aks/ "water" → /ts'ala̰ks/ "whirlpool"  (/ts'al/ "eye")
 /g̲an/ "tree; wood; stick" → /batsgn/ "arrive in a boat" (/batsk/ "arrive")
 /gyet/ "man" →  /gyitwaalgyit/ "raiders"   (/gyitwaal/ "attack")
 /ban/ "belly" → /waaybn/ "pregnant (for dogs and disparagingly for women)"  (/waay/ "paddle")
 /diilmx/ "respond"  This suffix is used to describe languages, so the language of the Haida would be /haydmx/

Proclitics
Below is a sample list of some of the many proclitics in Tsimshian. Attached to nouns and verbs, they may convey locative, aspectual, modal, case relational and lexical information. The following descriptions of the prefixes are intended to convey what sort of position the object or person is in. So /lax-/  can be used to express the top of the foot, because it has the properties of being "above" and "parallel", and /t'm-/ could be used for the backbone, because it has the properties of being "above" and "perpendicular". "Tangent" indicates that the object or action is taking place next to, or alongside of something. "Efferent" refers to going away from the action.

 Locative

 Stative
 /lax-/  tangent, above, parallel
 /t'm-/ tangent, above, perpendicular
 /lag̲ax/ tangent, not above, bilateral
 /ɫüü-, ɫüükɫi-, ɫüükwɫi-/ proximate, below
 /na̰k-/ proximate, not below
 /alo-, alu/ remote, below

 Motional
 /ksi-, ksa-, ksü-, xsa-/ internal source, efferent
 /g̲aɫdik-/ internal source, efferent, ascending
 /txa-/ internal source, efferent, descending
/bax-/ tangent source, tangent goal, ascending, parageographic
 /dzag̲am-/ geographic, upstream
 /uks-/ geographic, out to sea

 aspectual
 /si-, sü-, su-/ beginning, inception
 /adigul-/ continual, enduring
 /huk-/ habitual
 /gwüldm/ beforehand
 /wil-/ subsequent

 Modal
 /ap-, a̰b-/ certain
 /kbi-, xbi-/ not really, half
 /liks-, lüks-/ different, strange
 /sis-, süs-/ play, pretend
 /sm-/ real genuine (as in /sm'algyax/ "true language")

 Case
 /ha-/ instrumental
 /ha'ali-/ place or time for
 /sa̰-, si-, sü-, s-/ causative
 /xs-/ resemble

Lexical

Like the lexical suffixes, these proclitics derive from existing morphemes and can alter the stem meaning in various ways. Proclitics are much more common than suffixes; only a small list is provided.

 /aam/ "good" → /amadaalḵ/ "praise, worship" (/daalg̲/ "rebuke; scold")
 /gwa̰s/ "blanket" → /gwisg̲an/ "cedar bark mat coat; raincoat" (/g̲an/ "tree")
 /gyeɫk/ "to stab" → /gyiɫts'ax/ "nose-ring" (/ts'a̰ḵ/ "nose")
 /ts'usk/ "little" → /ts'übaa/ "lame (run a short distance)" (/baa/ "run")
 /'wiileeks/ "big" → /'wiiḵ'ooli/ "one with long hair" (/ḵ'ooli/ "scalp")

Syntax
Tsimshian is an ergative–absolutive language. Although nominal and verbal marking allows syntax to be freer than English, word order is still an important aspect of the phrase. The basic word order for transitive and intransitive sentences is:

Intransitive: TEMPORAL MARKER, verb, absolutive.

Transitive: TEMPORAL MARKER, verb, ergative, absolutive, indirect object, instrumental/benefactive/locative.

Inversions to this order are permitted. To place specific emphasis on the ergative noun (topicalization), it may be moved to the front of the phrase with the subsequent changes: temporal marker + /-t/ and /in-/ + verb. However, this order is only permitted if the topicalized ergative is a pronoun (independent, demonstrative, interrogative or relative). Proper nouns are never placed first in the sentence, except in a vocative sense. Any absolutive noun may be topicalized as well with the following changes: temporal marker + /t/ and verb + /da/. (Dunn has shown that the affixed particles on the temporal marker and the verb are falling out of use among the younger generation. It now is quite "formal" to use either in speech.)

Verb phrase
The basic verb phrase in Tsimshian is ordered: TEMPORAL MARKER, verb. However, many of the noun phrases in the sentence can be represented on both the verb and/or the temporal marker as pre-, in- or suffixes. There are five temporal markers which can combine to form various tenses or aspects. 
 /nah/: (perfective) /nah dzap/ "already made"
 /dm/: (future/progressive) /dm dzap/ "will make", "is going to make", "is making"
 /ɫa/: (near to present) /ɫa dzap/ "just beginning to make"
 /wil/: (sequentially following) /wil dzap/ "and then made"
 /yagwa/: (present-only with action verbs) /yagwa dzap/ "be making right now," "is now making"

Some combined temporal expressions:
 /ɫa-dm dzap/: "just about to start making"
 /nah ɫa-wil dzap/ "and then just finished making"
 /dm ɫa-wil dzap/ "and now  just about to start making"

Noun phrase
The basic noun phrase is ordered as: NUMERICAL MARKER, adjective, noun, determinater, possessive. A numerical marker and a determiner cannot appear in the same phrase together.

Numbers
Similar to classifiers in other languages, there are seven different counting systems depending on what is being counted. Abstract entities, flat objects and animals, round objects and units of time, human beings, long objects, canoes and lastly, measurements, all must be counted differently. The numeral gets an /-a/ connective if it ends in a stop, affricate or fricative. 
 /gu'pl uwalp/ "two houses"
 /t'apxaada guksɫüüsk/ "two shirts"
 /t'apxaaduul hana'nax/ "two women"
 /guladaada hana'nax/ "two women aboard (some conveyance)"
 /g̲abeeltk g̲axsoo/ "two canoes"

Adjectives
Like numerals, adjectives appear before the noun they modify. They take an /-m/ connective as well as match the noun in number (singular or plural). If both a numeral and an adjective appear together, the numeral always precedes the adjective. 
 /siipgm haasa/ "a sick dog"
 /txalpxdool al'alg̲m smgyigyet/ "four angry chiefs"

Determiners
Determiners follow the noun they modify and the noun gets a connective /-a/ suffix. There are six determinative words:
 /gwa'a/ "here, close to speaker"
 /gwasga/ "over there, that way"
 /doni/ "over there"
 /awaan/ "over there" (close to hearer)
 /gwi/ definite ("the")
 /ta'a/ for deceased kin only

Possessives
Possession is shown by placing the possessing noun after the object being possessed, which gets an /-a/ connective. If the object being possessed is not considered to be closely connected to the owner in some way (body parts, clothing, kin) then the object also gets a /na-/ prefix. 
 /gyigyeda huwaap/ "The color of the houses"
 /nahoon 'yuuta/ "the man's fish"

Ergatives
If the verb is transitive then the agent of the verb is treated as an ergative and the object as an absolutive. In these cases, the temporal marker receives the suffix /-t/, the verb receives /-da/ and the ergative noun itself has an /-a/ suffix. (Proper nouns require variant suffixes.)

Transitive sentences in which the verb is closely related to the absolutive can actually allow the noun to be attached onto the verb, a process called incorporation. A verbal connector /-m-/ is then used to suffix the noun onto the verb.

Absolutives
When an intransitive verb is used, the agent of the verb is treated as an absolutive. If the absolutive directly follows the verb then the verb receives an /-a/ suffix. (Proper nouns again require different suffixes.)

Pronominals
Much of the information appearing in a noun phrase can be expressed on the verb phrase as a pronominal. Ergative and absolutive phrases affix onto the verb phrase and take a different form depending on person and number. Below are the most common forms of absolutive suffixes, although depending on the tense, different suffixes are applicable.

If there is an (unmarked) ergative noun in the sentence along with the absolutive pronoun, the temporal marker also gets a suffixed /-t/. 

Dunn has found that some temporal markers take a suffix and others do not. It seems to be "a matter of local and personal style".

Ergative pronominals appear before the verb on the temporal marker as infixes or suffixes. Some tense markers call for different affixes. With the perfective tense /nah/, for instance, the ergative suffixes are identical to the absolutive suffixes. Below is the most common form of ergative affix.

Both pronominals can occur in one sentence:

Linguists and other scholars who have worked on the Tsimshian language
 Margaret Seguin Anderson
 William Beynon
 Franz Boas
 John A. Dunn

 Susan Marsden

 Jean Mulder
 Odille Morison
 Bishop William Ridley
 Fumiko Sasama
 Tonya Stebbins
 Marie-Lucie Tarpent
 Donna May Roberts
 Terri Burr
 John Reece
 Victoria Mckoy
 David Lang
 The Haayk Foundation

See also
 For the Tsimshian peoples see Tsimshian, Gitxsan, and Nisga'a

Notes

References
Boas, Franz (1911) "Tsimshian" In Handbook of American Indian Languages, vol. 1.  (Bureau of American Ethnology Bulletin, no. 40.)  Washington.
Dunn, John Asher (1978) A Practical Dictionary of the Tsimshian Language.  (National Museum of Man, Mercury Series, Canadian Ethnology Service Paper, no. 42.)  Ottawa: National Museums of Canada.
Dunn, John A. (1979) A Reference Grammar for the Tsimshian Language.  (National Museum of Man, Mercury Series, Ethnology Service Paper, no. 55.)  Ottawa: National Museums of Canada.
Dunn, J. A. (1995) Sm'algyax: A Reference Dictionary and Grammar for the Tsimshian Language (University of Washington Press and Sealaska Heritage Foundation) University of Pennsylvania Library
Mulder, Jean Gail (1994) Ergativity in Tsimshian (Sm'algyax).  Berkeley: University of California Press.
Schulenberg, A.C. Graf von der, (1992) Schulenberg's Tsimshian Grammar trans. Virginia C. Flaherty, University of Colorado (orig. "Die Sprache der Zsimshian-Indianer" 1894, Braunschweig).
Stebbins, Tonya (2001) Emergent Spelling Patterns in Sm'algyax (Tsimshian, British Columbia).  Written Language and Literacy, vol. 4, no. 2, pp. 163–193.
Stebbins, Tonya (2003) Fighting Language Endangerment: Community Directed Research on Sm'algyax (Tsimshian).  Osaka, Japan: Faculty of Informatics, Osaka Gakuin University
Stebbins, Tonya (2020) Fighting Language Endangerment: Community Directed Research on Sm'algyax (Tsimshian). 2nd Edition, Melbourne, Australia: La Trobe eBureau

External links
 Sm'algyax Living Legacy Talking Dictionary
 A Zimshian Version of Portions of the Book of Common Prayer (1882) translated by Ridley
 Bibliography of Materials on the Tsimshian Language
 OLAC resources in and about the Tsimshian language

Tsimshianic languages
Endangered Tsimshianic languages
Indigenous languages of the Pacific Northwest Coast
First Nations languages in Canada
Indigenous languages of Alaska
Official languages of Alaska